No One Is Innocent stylized as [no one is innocent] is a French rock band originating from Paris featuring the French Armenian Kémar Gulbenkian as main vocalist. The band was established in 1994 charting with their 1994 hit "La peau". The band that saw a number of changes in its line-up has released five studio and two live albums.

Formation 
First formation
 Kémar Gulbenkian - vocals
 Jérome-David Suzat - bass, synthesizer, rhythm box, berimbau
 Thierry Molinier - drums
 Guy Perrot - 1st guitare
 Hakim Ouazad - guitar
 Matthieu Imberty - guitar
 David Defour - guitar
 Spagg - sampling

Second formation
 Kémar Gulbenkian - vocals
 Shanka (François Maigret) - guitar
 Djules (Julien Reymond) - bass
 Greg Jacks - drums
 Kmille - machines, production

Third formation
 Kémar Gulbenkian - vocals
 Shanka (François Maigret) - guitar
 Bertrand - bass
 Yann Coste - drums

Fourth formation 
 Kémar Gulbenkian - vocals
 Shanka (François Maigret) - guitar
 Bertrand Dessoliers - bass
 Yann Coste - drums
 Ludovic Mazard - machines

Discography

Albums
Studio albums

Live albums

Singles

References

External links
Official website

Musical groups from Paris
French rock music groups